Michael Preben, Count Ahlefeldt-Laurvig-Bille (born 26 February 1965) is a Danish Count and a landowner. By birth he is a member of an ancient House of Ahlefeldt.

Early life
He was born as the only son of Count Claus Christian of Ahlefeldt-Laurvig-Bille (1932-2014) and his second wife, Merete-Anette von Lüttichau, née Countess of Ahlefeldt-Laurvig (b. 1943), who was also her husband's third cousin. He has one sister, Countess Susanne Ingrid of Ahlefeldt-Laurvig-Bille (b. 1967), who married Erik Ove Carl Johan Emil Vind (b. 1954), grandson of Prince Erik of Denmark.

Biography
In 1992, he assumed ownership of the family's residence Egeskov Castle near Kværndrup, from his father Count Claus Christian. Under his ownership, Egeskov Castle has been turned into one of Funen's major tourist attractions. He was awarded the title of Hofjægermester(hunting master of the court) in 2006 and the title of Kammerherre (chamberlain) in 2015.

Personal life
Michael married firstly to Margrethe Kirketerp-Moller (b. 1965) in 1992. They have a son and a daughter:

 Countess Marie-Sophie Elisabeth of Ahlefeldt-Laurvig-Bille (born 1993)
 Count Gregers Carl Preben of Ahlefeldt-Laurvig-Bille (born 1995), a godson of the Crown Prince of Denmark

He married secondly Caroline Søeborg Ohlsen (b. 1968) in 2006. The couple divorced in 2016 and had two children:

 Count Julius Søeborg Ahlefeldt Laurvig-Bille (born 2007), a godson of Prince Joachim of Denmark
 Countess Iselin Kristine Søeborg Ahlefeldt-Laurvig-Bille (born 2009)

On 18 May 2019, he married Princess Alexandra of Sayn-Wittgenstein-Berleburg, niece of Queen Margrethe II of Denmark, at Sankt Jørgens Kirke in Svendborgsund.

References

1965 births
21st-century Danish landowners
20th-century Danish nobility
21st-century Danish nobility
Counts of Denmark
Danish counts
Living people
House of Ahlefeldt
Bille family